Wyoming Highway 271 (WYO 271) is a  east–west Wyoming State Road known as Twenty Mile Road and is located in west-central Niobrara County, Wyoming, United States.

Route description
Wyoming Highway 271 travels from Wyoming Highway 270 at Lance Creek west 3.19 miles to West Lance Creek where it ends and Niobrara CR 23 takes over. Milepost zero is at its eastern junction with Wyoming Highway 270. WYO 271 also provides access to the local airport.

Major intersections

References

External links 

Wyoming State Routes 200-299
WYO 271 - WYO 270 to Twenty Mile Road/CR 23

Transportation in Niobrara County, Wyoming
271